Kiril Kachamanov (born 20 April 1965) is a Bulgarian former professional footballer who played as a defender.

Honours
CSKA Sofia
Bulgarian League (3): 1986–87, 1988–89, 1989–90
Bulgarian Cup: 1989–90

Slavia Sofia
Bulgarian League: 1995–96
Bulgarian Cup: 1995–96

References

External links
Kachamanov Statistics with CSKA at fccska.com

1965 births
Living people
Bulgarian footballers
PFC CSKA Sofia players
PFC Minyor Pernik players
PFC Slavia Sofia players
First Professional Football League (Bulgaria) players
Association football defenders
Bulgarian football managers
PFC Slavia Sofia managers